Trent Salkeld is an Australian former professional rugby league footballer who played in the 2000s. He played for the Newcastle Knights in 2005. In one match, he scored three tries against the Sydney Roosters but the Knights lost the match 28–14.

External links
Statistics at rugbyleagueproject.org

1981 births
Living people
Australian rugby league players
Newcastle Knights players
Rugby league wingers
Western Suburbs Rosellas players
Place of birth missing (living people)